Joy of Learning is a 1969 film by Jean-Luc Godard. The shooting started before the events of May 68 and was finished shortly afterwards. Coproduced by the O.R.T.F., the film was upon completion rejected by French national television, then released in the cinema where it was subsequently banned by the French government. The film is an adaptation of Emile, or On Education, Jean-Jacques Rousseau's treatise on education, and its title is a reference to Nietzsche's The Gay Science. The film was entered into the 19th Berlin International Film Festival.

Plot
Patricia and Émile meet at night in the middle of nowhere. While reading, listening to the radio and discussing the information they are retrieving, they develop mutual beliefs.

Cast
 Juliet Berto - Patricia Lumumba
 Jean-Pierre Léaud - Émile Rousseau
 Jean-Luc Godard - Narrator (voice)

References

External links
 

1969 films
1960s French-language films
1969 drama films
Films directed by Jean-Luc Godard
French black-and-white films
French avant-garde and experimental films
Non-narrative films
1960s French films